Howard Edgar Bayne (July 28, 1942 – May 14, 2018) was an American basketball player.

University of Tennessee
At 6'6" and 230 lbs, a fierce competitor, this All-Southeastern Conference player was known as the "Chairman of the Boards" during his tenure as a power forward under Coach Ray Mears at the University of Tennessee. Bayne was considered by many to be Mears greatest intimidator, “Howard was the greatest intimidator I have ever had on a basketball team,” Mears told the Knoxville Journal's Ben Byrd in “The Basketball Vols.” “When Howard went after the ball, there weren’t many people who felt like arguing with him.”

Professional basketball
He was selected by the Baltimore Bullets in the 15th round (107th pick overall) of the 1966 NBA draft.

He played for the Kentucky Colonels (1967–68) in the American Basketball Association for 69 games.  As a Colonel, Bayne was known as an "enforcer skilled primarily at fouling the opposition".

References

External links

1942 births
2018 deaths
American men's basketball players
Baltimore Bullets (1963–1973) draft picks
Basketball players from Dayton, Ohio
Kentucky Colonels players
Power forwards (basketball)
Tennessee Volunteers basketball players